Anthony Fisher (born ), also known by the nickname of "Fishcake", is a Welsh former rugby union, and professional rugby league footballer who played in the 1960s and 1970s, and coached rugby league in the 1980s and 1990s.

Background
Tony Fisher was born in Swansea, Glamorgan, Wales.

Playing career

International honours
Fisher won caps for Wales (RL) while at Bradford Northern in 1970 against England, while at Leeds in the 1975 Rugby League World Cup against France, England, Australia, New Zealand, while at Castleford in the 1975 Rugby League World Cup against England, Australia, and New Zealand, and in 1977 against England and France, and while at Bradford Northern in 1978 against Australia, and won caps for Great Britain (RL) while at Bradford/Leeds in 1970 against Australia (2 matches), New Zealand (3 matches), and Australia (2 matches), while at Leeds in 1971 against France (2 matches), and in 1978 against Australia (2 matches).

Challenge Cup Final appearances
Tony Fisher played  in Leeds' 7-24 defeat by Leigh in the 1971 Challenge Cup Final during the 1970–71 season at Wembley Stadium, London on Saturday 15 May 1971, in front of a crowd of 85,514, and played  in the 13-16 defeat by St. Helens in the 1972 Challenge Cup Final during the 1971–72 season at Wembley Stadium, London on Saturday 13 May 1972, in front of a crowd of 89,495.

County Cup Final appearances
Tony Fisher played as an interchange/substitute, i.e. number 12, (replacing  Terry Clawson) in Leeds' 36-9 victory over Dewsbury in the 1972 Yorkshire County Cup Final during the 1972–73 season at Odsal Stadium, Bradford on Saturday 7 October 1972, played left-, i.e. number 8, in Castleford's 17-7 victory over Featherstone Rovers in the 1977 Yorkshire County Cup Final during the 1977–78 season at Headingley Rugby Stadium, Leeds on Saturday 15 October 1977, and played  in Bradford Northern's 18-8 victory over York in the 1978 Yorkshire County Cup Final during the 1978–79 season at Headingley Rugby Stadium, Leeds on Saturday 28 October 1978.

BBC2 Floodlit Trophy Final appearances
Tony Fisher played  in Leeds' 9-5 victory over St. Helens in the 1970 BBC2 Floodlit Trophy Final during the 1970–71 season at Headingley Rugby Stadium, Leeds on Tuesday 15 December 1970.

Player's No.6 Trophy Final appearances
Tony Fisher played  in  Leeds' 12-7 victory over Salford in the 1972–73 Player's No.6 Trophy Final during the 1972–73 season at Fartown Ground, Huddersfield on Saturday 24 March 1973.

Genealogical information
Tony Fisher is the younger brother of the rugby union, and rugby league footballer; Idwal Fisher.

References

 Match programme – Wales vs France (16 Feb 1975)

External links
!Great Britain Statistics at englandrl.co.uk (statistics currently missing due to not having appeared for both Great Britain, and England)
Photograph "A word in your ear – Terry Price has a word in Tony Fisher's ear as they return to the dressing room. – 09/03/1968" at rlhp.co.uk
Photograph "Syd Hynes – Hynes, the Leeds centre, races through with Fisher closing in. – 13/09/1969" at rlhp.co.uk
Photograph "Fisher and Rhodes – Hooker T Fisher and A Rhodes bring down Bramley off-half Wolford – 02/11/1969" at rlhp.co.uk
Photograph "Miss Bradford Northern presents trophy – Great Britain hooker, Tony Fisher being presented with the Bradford Northern Supporters "Player of the Year" Trophy by Miss Bradford Northern, Mary Greenough. – 01/01/1970" at rlhp.co.uk
Photograph "Tony Fisher Scores – Tony Fisher, Northern hooker, crashes through a double tackle to score only his second try for Northern in his career at Odsal – 31/01/1970" at rlhp.co.uk
Photograph "No Escape – No escape for this Doncaster player as the terrible twins Jim Mills and Tony Fisher tackle him during the match at Odsal. – 31/01/1970" at rlhp.co.uk
Photograph "Fisher hauled down – Tony Fisher is halted by two Australians. – 08/10/1978" at rlhp.co.uk
Photograph "Fisher double tackled – Tony Fisher falls to a double tackle in today's match against Wigan. – 22/10/1978" at rlhp.co.uk
Team – Past Players – E→F at swansearfc.co.uk (profile missing)
Doncaster RLFC: Legendary ex-coach and star players reunite
Battle of Brisbane players reunite 40 years on

1940s births
Living people
Bradford Bulls players
Bramley R.L.F.C. coaches
Castleford Tigers players
Dewsbury Rams coaches
Doncaster R.L.F.C. coaches
Footballers who switched code
Great Britain national rugby league team players
Keighley Cougars coaches
Leeds Rhinos players
Place of birth missing (living people)
Rugby league hookers
Rugby league players from Swansea
Rugby league props
Rugby union hookers
Rugby union players from Swansea
South Africa national rugby league team coaches
Swansea RFC players
Wales national rugby league team players
Welsh rugby league coaches
Welsh rugby league players
Welsh rugby union players